Bixio Celio (June 6, 1928 – April 11, 1983) was a Swiss professional ice hockey player who competed for the Swiss national team at the 1952 Winter Olympics.

References

1928 births
1983 deaths
Ice hockey players at the 1952 Winter Olympics
Olympic ice hockey players of Switzerland
Swiss ice hockey right wingers